The Harvard Krokodiloes ("The Kroks") are Harvard University's oldest a cappella singing group, founded in 1946. The group consists of twelve tuxedo-clad undergraduates, and they sing songs from the Great American Songbook and beyond.

The group has performed on The Tonight Show Starring Johnny Carson, Good Morning America, National Public Radio, and on numerous international national television programs. Each summer, the Krokodiloes travel around the world on an eleven-week, six-continent tour. They have recorded 31 albums.

They derive their name from the ancient Greek word for crocodile, krokodilos. The group's motto is Nunc Est Cantandum, or “Now is the time to sing.”

History 

The Kroks were founded in 1946, when four members of the Hasty Pudding Club at 12 Holyoke Street, popular for its drag musical theatre productions, began singing popular hits of their time in four-part harmony.

The Krokodiloes have performed around the world for hosts including Ella Fitzgerald, Princess Grace of Monaco, Princess Caroline of Monaco, the Aga Khan, and King Bhumibol of Thailand. They had a particularly close relationship with Leonard Bernstein, who became friends with the group first in 1973, when he composed a setting to an E. E. Cummings poem "if you can't eat." In 1983 Bernstein wrote an original song for the group, "Screwed On Wrong," and provided an introductory letter that helped launch the group's first annual international summer tour.

Since 1989 the group has appeared four times at Carnegie Hall, debuting there to a sold-out audience in 1989 at a concert to benefit world hunger, in the spring of 1995 in an American Red Cross benefit, in May 1998 in a concert for Mothers Against Drunk Driving, and most recently at Zankel Hall in March 2008.

In 1993, the Kroks performed as the opening act at the New England Inaugural Ball celebrating the inauguration of US President Bill Clinton.

In 1997, the Kroks performed at the June 30 Hong Kong handover ceremonies commemorating the return of Hong Kong to China.

Notable alumni

Krokodiloes alumni are listed on the group's archive website.

Paris Barclay  Emmy-winning television director
 Matthew Bohrer   actor
James Bundy, Tony Award-nominated director and current Dean of the Yale School of Drama
Frank Cabot (one of the group's founders), horticulturist/author
George Howe Colt, National Book Award-nominated author
Gregory Craig  White House Counsel to Obama
Miles Fisher  musician, actor
 William B. Gray  public official
Fred Gwynne, star of TV shows Car 54, Where Are You? and The Munsters, and such films as My Cousin Vinny
Winthrop Jordan  National Book Award winner
W. Leo Kiely  CEO, MillerCoors
William F. Kuntz II, United States district judge
Peter Lerangis  children's author
Ryan Leslie, producer, recording artist
George C. Lodge, former assistant secretary of labor for international affairs in the Eisenhower and Kennedy administrations
Stuart Malina, Tony Award-winning music director and orchestrator for the Broadway musical Movin' Out
Laurence O'Keefe, composer-lyricist for musicals such as Legally Blonde (for which he received a Tony Award-nomination) and Bat Boy: The Musical
Mark O'Keefe  screenwriter
James A. Paul, writer
Fred Reichheld  best-selling business-book author
David Rockefeller, Jr.  philanthropist
Austin Weber, Thomas T. Hoopes Prize winning musician and artist
Joshuah Campbell, Grammy- and Oscar-nominated composer 
Michael Mitnick,  playwright 
Matthew Guard,  director of Skylark Vocal Ensemble and three-time Grammy nominee 
Daniel Pearle,  playwright and screenwriter

References

External links
Official website
Rapkin, Mickey. "Perfect Tone, in a Key That’s Mostly Minor." The New York Times, 2008-03-23, Sunday Styles section, p. 1.

Collegiate a cappella groups
Krokodiloes, The
University choirs
Musical groups established in 1946